Rosslyn  is the westernmost station on the shared segment of the Blue, Orange, and Silver lines of the Washington Metro. It is located in the Rosslyn neighborhood of Arlington, Virginia, United States. Rosslyn is the first station in Virginia heading westward from the District on the Orange and Silver Lines and southward on the Blue Lines. It is one of four interchange points on the Metrorail system west of the Potomac River and located in a growing business district.

Rosslyn is the biggest choke point of the Metro system. Due to this, planners are considering adding another station in the Rosslyn neighborhood, possibly as part of an inner loop through Washington and Arlington.

Location
The station has entrances on the west side of North Moore Street between Wilson Boulevard and 19th Street North and on the east side of Fort Myer Drive between Wilson Boulevard and 19th Street North. A bank of three high-speed street elevators to the mezzanine (upper) level of the station is on the east side of North Moore Street, across the street from the station entrance. The station is a stop for several express Metrobus lines, including the 5A to Washington Dulles International Airport and L'Enfant Plaza.

History
The station opened on July 1, 1977. Orange Line service to the station began upon the line's opening on November 20, 1978.

Station layout 
Rosslyn is one of two stations (the other being the Pentagon station) at which trains going one direction are boarded on a different station level than trains going the other direction, as a way to prevent an at-grade crossing. This is because the Orange/Silver and Blue lines split apart an extremely short distance from the station. This ensures that no trains traveling in opposite directions share a track.

Rosslyn is the deepest station on the three lines servicing it. This because its neighborhood is on a bluff over the Potomac River, while its shared rail line into Washington passes through a rock-bored tunnel up to  beneath the river surface. An escalator ride between the street and mezzanine levels takes about three minutes. 

A new bank of three high-speed elevators and an expanded mezzanine opened officially on October 7, 2013. It replaces the original single street elevator, cutting elevator transit time from about a minute to about 17 seconds. The underground hallway to the new elevator bank contains a four-coffered arch like most underground stops on the Red Line that were opened after 1980. This is the only stop on the Blue, Orange, and Silver Lines with this arch. It is also the only stop in the system that contains both the waffle and four-coffer arch design.

Notable places nearby
 Artisphere
 Freedom Park
 Marine Corps War Memorial
 Netherlands Carillon

Gallery

References

External links

 The Schumin Web Transit Center: Rosslyn Station
 Fort Myer Drive entrance from Google Maps Street View
 Moore Street entrance from Google Maps Street View

Stations on the Blue Line (Washington Metro)
Stations on the Orange Line (Washington Metro)
Stations on the Silver Line (Washington Metro)
Transportation in Arlington County, Virginia
Washington Metro stations in Virginia
Railway stations in the United States opened in 1977
1977 establishments in Virginia
Rosslyn, Virginia